Karthago is a Hungarian rock band, one of the most popular during the eighties, playing American-style west coast rock.

Disambiguation with the early 70s German band Karthago

Band history
The band was founded in 1979 by Ferenc Szigeti, releasing their self-titled debut album in 1981, which sold 178.000 copies and established the band's fame. After winning an international contest in Austria, they got a two-record deal for Western Europe. They toured Austria, East Germany and other Soviet Bloc countries. The band broke up in 1985 but in they reunited for a concert at Petőfi Csarnok, Budapest in 1990, followed by two others in 1997 and 2000. The band then started a 15-stop tour in 2003, culminating in their first new album after 19 years. They have been active since then, performing often all around Hungary.

Members
Attila Gidófalvy  - keyboards, vocals
Zoltán 'Zéró' Kiss   - bass, vocals,
Ferenc Szigeti  - bandleader, guitars, vocals, 
Miklós Kocsándi  - drums, vocals
Tamás Takáts  - vocals, front member, harmonica, drums

Discography
 Karthago (1981)
 1...2...3...Start! - Popmajális (concert recording) (1982)
 Ezredforduló (1982)
 Requiem (English) (1983)
 Senki földjén (1984)
 Oriental Dream (English) (1985)
 Aranyalbum (selection) (1990)
 Best of Karthago (selection) (1993)
 Haminyó anyó (EP) (1997)
 A Karthago él (concert recording) (1997)
 ValóságRock (2004)
 Időtörés (2009)
 30 éves Jubileumi Óriáskoncert (2010)

Sources
Band history on the official page
On the way of our Fathers

External links
karthagoband.com - Official home page

Hungarian rock music groups
Musical groups established in 1979